Hamp Atkinson was a Texas Democratic politician who served in the Texas House of Representatives from 1975 to 1983.

Life

Atkinson was born on December 23, 1933 in New Boston, Texas to Ballard and Sybil Garrett Atkinson. He died on July 5, 2016 at the age of 82 in De Kalb, Texas.

Politics
Hamp Atkinson was a democrat. He served in the Texas House from 1975 to 1983. He retired after his fourth term in office.

References

1933 births
2016 deaths
Democratic Party members of the Texas House of Representatives
People from New Boston, Texas
20th-century American politicians